James Parker was a New Zealand rugby league footballer who represented New Zealand.

Parker played for New Zealand against the 1914 touring Great Britain Lions before going on the 1919 tour of Australia where no test matches were played.
In 2008 he was named in the Taranaki Rugby League Team of the Century.

References

Year of birth missing
Year of death missing
New Zealand rugby league players
New Zealand national rugby league team players
Taranaki rugby league team players
Wellington rugby league team players
Rugby league props
Place of birth missing